The Cameron Aggies are the athletic team that represent Cameron University, located in Lawton, Oklahoma, in NCAA Division II intercollegiate sports.

The Aggies compete as members of the Lone Star Conference for all 14 varsity sports.

Varsity sports

Teams

Men's sports
 Baseball
 Basketball
 Cross Country
 Golf
 Tennis
 Track & Field

Women's sports
 Basketball
 Cross Country
 Golf
 Softball
 Spirit Team
 Tennis
 Track & Field
 Volleyball

Individual sports

Men's basketball

In the 1970s, as an NAIA Division I basketball program, the Aggies won three District IX Championships, as well as the 1980 NAIA men's basketball championship. This was the first national championship for Cameron athletics.

Football
In 1987, Cameron defeated Carson-Newman (Tenn.) 30–2 to win the NAIA Division I Football National Championship. Cameron had previously won a national championship as a junior college, as well, but the university discontinued football on December 11, 1992, to balance the number of sports offered to men and women, respectively.

Men's golf
Jerry Hrnciar has been the head coach of the men's golf program since 1975, and his teams have appeared in the NAIA National Championship Tournament in 1977, 1978, 1982, 1983 (National Champion), 1984, 1985, 1986, and 1987.  After Cameron University made the switch to NCAA Division II, Hrnciar's teams have qualified in 1990, 1991, 1994, 1996, 1998, 2001, 2002, 2006, 2007, 2010, and 2011.

Women's basketball
The women's basketball program has been in place since 1910.  In 2002, the team won the Lone Star Conference championship.

Head coaches

 CE Hansen (1910–1911)
 GL Hawkinson (1913–1914)
 Robert M. Park (1920–1921)
 BF Jolly (1921–1922)
 Thomas James Crouch (1922–1923)
 GV Dennis (1924–1927)
 EC Reynolds (1927–1928)
 William Huff (1928–1929)
 Oma Carter (1929–1930)
 Lena Japp (1930–1931)
 Lyle Yarborough (1943–1946)
 Val Maples (1958–1978)
 RT Toma (1978–1986)
 Billy Carter (1986–1989)
 Laina McDonald (1989–1997)
 Stacy Johnson (1997–2000)
 Adrian Wiggins (2000–2002)
 Dick Halterman (2002–2006)
 Kevin Kackerott (2006–2007)
 Tom Webb (2007–16)
 Emma Andrews (2016– )

References

External links